Dolni Glavanak is a village in the municipality of Madzharovo, in Haskovo Province, in southern Bulgaria.

A megalithic stone circle, the Dolni Glavanak Cromlech lies 2 km west of the village. Constructed from 15 pyramid-shaped stones, the formation is roughly circular in shape and has a diameter of 10 metres. The stone circle dates to the Early Iron Age (8th-7th century BCE). It was discovered in 1998 by the archaeologist Georgi Nehrizov.

References

Villages in Haskovo Province